Czech Republic–Slovakia relations are foreign relations between the Czech Republic and Slovakia.

Country comparison

History
Before 1918, both countries were part of Austria-Hungary; however, after the Ausgleich of 1867 the Czech lands belonged to the Austrian Empire while Slovakia belonged to the administratively separate Kingdom of Hungary. Between 1918 and December 31, 1992, both countries were part of Czechoslovakia. 

Both countries established diplomatic relations on January 1, 1993. These international relations are usually referred to or described as "very good", "cordial", and "above standard" in the media. When a Czech or Slovak president is inaugurated, very often their first international visit is to the other part of the former country. The same custom applies to newly elected prime ministers of the Czech Republic and Slovakia.

Both countries are full members of NATO and of the European Union. There are around 200,000 people of Slovak descent living in the Czech Republic and around 46,000 people of Czech descent living in Slovakia. Gustáv Slamečka, a Slovak citizen, was a Minister of Transportation of the Czech Republic from 2009 to 2010 and in his office he exclusively used the Slovak language.

In December 2016 Slovak government ratified the Treaty of Cooperation on Mutual Protection of Airspace, which allows the use of Czech and Slovak military aircraft in the airspace of the other one and the possible reinforcement of one air force by its neighbour's counterpart in time of need. After the ratification from the Czech side, it came into effect in July 2017.

Resident diplomatic missions
 The Czech Republic has an embassy in Bratislava.
 Slovakia has an embassy in Prague.

See also

 Dissolution of Czechoslovakia

References

External links
Czech embassy in Bratislava (in Czech only)

 
Slovakia
Bilateral relations of Slovakia